Ann or Anne Sullivan may refer to:

 Ann Sullivan (animator) (1929–2020), American animator
 Anne Sullivan (1866–1936), American teacher
 Anne Grosvenor, Duchess of Westminster (1915–2003), Irish-born peeress
 Anne Sullivan (Pretty Little Liars)

See also
 
 Centro Ann Sullivan del Perú, NGO in Peru